Kesi (K'o-ssu in Wade-Giles) is a technique in Chinese silk tapestry. It is admired for its lightness and clarity of pattern. At first, this technique was chiefly used to protect scrolls containing paintings. It was also employed as a support for paintings, later going on to become an esteemed art form. This art form especially flourished between the eleventh and thirteenth centuries.

The Sogdians from Central Asia during the mid-1st millennium brought their art and technique of textile tapestry to China (the Sogdians established flourishing communities throughout, and by the 6th century, their textile patterns were already being seen in China), and it is through this Silk Road influence, resulted in what became known as "kesi".   During the Song dynasty, the art of the "kesi" reached its height.

It is a tapestry weave, normally using silk on a small scale compared to European wall-hangings. Clothing for the court was one of the main uses. The density of knots is typically very high, with a gown of the best quality perhaps involving as much work as a much larger European tapestry.  Initially used for small pieces, often with animal, bird and flower decoration, or dragons for imperial clothing, under the Ming dynasty it was used to copy paintings.

"Kesi" means "cut silk", as the technique uses short lengths of weft thread that are tucked into the textile.  Only the weft threads are visible in the finished fabric.  Unlike continuous weft brocade, in k'o-ssu each colour area was woven from a separate bobbin, making the style both technically demanding and time-consuming.

Kesi first appeared during the Tang dynasty (618–907), and became popular in the Southern Song dynasty (1127–1279), reaching its height during the Ming dynasty (1368–1644).  The style continued to be popular until the early 20th century, and the end of the Qing dynasty in 1911–12.

Further reading

Mailey, Jean, The Manchu Dragon: Costumes of the Ch'ing Dynasty, 1644–1912, 1980, Metropolitan Museum of Art, fully online
Preist, Alan, Simmons, Pauline, Chinese Textiles: An Introduction to the Study of their History, Sources, Technique, Symbolism, and Use, 1934, Metropolitan Museum of Art, fully online

References

External links

"Kesi"  — Encyclopædia Britannica Premium Service (retrieved 19 November 2020)

Tapestries
Silk
Tang dynasty art
Textile arts of China
Sogdian art